Battista Mismetti (31 October 1925 – 29 March 2017) was an Italian cross-country skier. He competed in the men's 50 kilometre event at the 1956 Winter Olympics.

References

External links
 

1925 births
2017 deaths
Italian male cross-country skiers
Olympic cross-country skiers of Italy
Cross-country skiers at the 1956 Winter Olympics
Sportspeople from the Province of Bergamo